Jeen van den Berg (8 January 1928 – 8 October 2014) was a Dutch long track speed skating athlete primarily known as the winner of the Elfstedentocht of 1954. He competed in the race a record seven times, with his first race being in 1947 and his final one in 1997.

On 3 February 1954, van den Berg finished the race in a record 7 hours and 35 minutes, a record finally bettered by Evert van Benthem 31 years later. He came third in the infamous 1963 race.

In 1973 he became the first Dutch marathon skate champion.

Olympic Games
As a long-track speed skater, Van den Berg took part at the 1956 and 1960 Winter Olympics.
In 1956 he finished 24th at the 5000 meters and in 1960 he ended 19th at the 5000 and 22nd at the 1500 meters.

Personal records

Source:

Tournament overview

DNS = Did not start
NC = No classification
source:

Personal life and death
Married to Atty, van den Berg was a teacher by profession. In 2014 he suffered a cerebral hemorrhage and died in a nursing home on 8 October 2014 at the age of 86.

References

External links
 
 

1928 births
2014 deaths
People from Smallingerland
Dutch male speed skaters
Speed skaters at the 1956 Winter Olympics
Speed skaters at the 1960 Winter Olympics
Olympic speed skaters of the Netherlands
Sportspeople from Friesland